Pernille Brandstrup Knudsen (born 31 July 1997) is a Danish sprint canoeist.

She competed at the 2021 ICF Canoe Sprint World Championships, winning a bronze medal in the K-1 1000 m distance.

References

External links

1997 births
Living people
Danish female canoeists
ICF Canoe Sprint World Championships medalists in kayak
European Games competitors for Denmark
Canoeists at the 2019 European Games